Milo Milunović (6 August 1897 in Cetinje, Principality of Montenegro – 11 February 1967 in Belgrade, SR Serbia, SFRY) was a distinguished Yugoslav and Montenegrin painter. He dabbled in both Impressionism and Cubism.

Biography

Milunović was born in Cetinje, Montenegro, but was educated in Shkodër, Monza, Florence (under the apprenticeship of Augusto Giacometti), and later in Paris. He joined the Montenegrin army in the World War I, and from 1919 to 1922 lived in Paris, where he became acquainted with the works of Cézanne. He spent 1923 in Prčanj, where he painted frescoes in the local church. From 1924 to 1926 he lived in Zagreb, Paris, and later Belgrade, where with two colleagues he founded the Academy of Arts, Belgrade. He painted his most successful works between 1926 and 1932, most of which were impressionist.

Among his pupils was the painters Danica Đurović and  Nikola Gvozdenović Gvozdo.

Painting

His works were characterized by a rationalistic approach, both to composition and space. Anti-illusionistic devices were used in the representation of space. Milunovic's art can sometimes be seen as abstract, other times as impressionistic, and even sometimes as Fauvist.

References

External links

Webpage with Milunović's works
Index of Biographical Links

Montenegrin painters
Artists from Cetinje
1897 births
1967 deaths
Yugoslav artists
Impressionist painters
Cubist artists